Ma Nyein Thaw Mee is a 2002 Burmese drama film, directed by Naung Htun Lwin and Nyi Nyi Htun Lwin starring Dwe, Moht Moht Myint Aung, Nandar Hlaing, Nay Aung and Cho Pyone.

Cast
Dwe as Ye Yint
Moht Moht Myint Aung as Khin Khin Kyaw
Nandar Hlaing as Shwe Hinthar
Nay Aung as U Moe Hein
Cho Pyone as Daw Yin Hla
Phone Naing as Maung Maung Kyaw
Hsu Pan Htwar as Pan Ei
Htun Htun Naing as U Soe Kyaw
Wyne as Paing Soe
Aung Khine as Aung Kyaw
Myin Sai Thar Aung Aung as Toe Aung
Kyaw Zay Ya as Win Zaw
Nay Myo Aung as Aung Maung
San San Aye as Daw Thet Pan
Tin Tin Hla as Daw Kyar Nyo
Soe Moe Kyi as Mya Yin
Saw Naing as U Aww Bar
Kutho as Sein Thaung
Kin Kaung as Than Htay
Nga Pyaw Kyaw as Khin Zaw
Ayeyar as Ohn Kyaing
Nyaung Nyaung as Ba Tint

References

2002 films
2000s Burmese-language films
Burmese drama films
Films shot in Myanmar
2002 drama films